Paul Anton Heinrich Rehkopf (21 May 1872 – 29 June 1949) was a German actor.

He was born in Braunschweig and died in Braunschweig, Germany

Selected filmography

 Diary of a Lost Woman (1918)
 Film Kathi (1918)
 Lorenzo Burghardt (1918)
 Der Mädchenhirt (1919)
 President Barrada (1920)
 The Dancer of Jaipur (1920)
 Four Around a Woman (1921)
 Destiny (1921)
 Night and No Morning (1921)
 The Red Masquerade Ball (1921)
 The Man in the Background (1922)
 The Circle of Death (1922)
 The Sleeping Volcano (1922)
 The Love Story of Cesare Ubaldi (1922)
 Rose of the Asphalt Streets (1922)
 Madame Golvery (1923)
 Tatjana (1923)
 I Had a Comrade (1923)
 His Wife, The Unknown (1923)
 The Secret of the Duchess (1923)
 Horrido (1924)
 Playing with Destiny (1924)
 Man Against Man (1924)
 Varieté (1925)
 A Free People (1925)
 Oh Those Glorious Old Student Days (1925)
 In the Name of the Kaisers (1925)
 The Fallen (1926)
 Lace (1926)
 The Armoured Vault (1926)
 Our Daily Bread (1926)
 White Slave Traffic (1926)
 The Field Marshal (1927)
 Poor Little Colombine (1927)
 The Tragedy of a Lost Soul (1927)
 Out of the Mist (1927)
 The False Prince (1927)
 Spies (1928)
 Under Suspicion (1928)
 The Page Boy at the Golden Lion (1928)
 Mary Lou (1928)
 The Great Adventuress (1928)
 The Convict from Istanbul (1929)
 Beyond the Street (1929)
 Sinful and Sweet (1929)
 The Call of the North (1929)
 What a Woman Dreams of in Springtime (1929)
 Roses Bloom on the Moorland (1929)
 The Caviar Princess (1930)
 Eskimo (1930)
 Him or Me (1930)
 Fire in the Opera House (1930)
 Fairground People (1930)
 The Stolen Face (1930)
 Berlin-Alexanderplatz (1931)
 A Storm Over Zakopane (1931)
 The Captain from Köpenick (1931)
 Night Convoy (1932)
 The White Demon (1932)
 Ship Without a Harbour (1932)
 Scandal on Park Street (1932)
 The Dancer of Sanssouci (1932)
 Haunted People (1932)
 The White God (1932)
 Love Must Be Understood (1933)
 Little Girl, Great Fortune  (1933)
 The Peak Scaler (1933)
 Polish Blood (1934)
 The World Without a Mask (1934)
 The Sporck Battalion (1934)
 The Bird Seller (1935)
 The Young Count (1935)
 Artist Love (1935)
 Stradivari (1935)
 When the Cock Crows (1936)
 Winter in the Woods (1936)
 Land of Love (1937)
 The Divine Jetta (1937)
 Serenade (1937)
 Fanny Elssler (1937)
 The Hound of the Baskervilles (1937)
 Secret Code LB 17 (1938)
 The Tiger of Eschnapur (1938)
 Shadows Over St. Pauli (1938) 
 The Indian Tomb (1938)
 The Blue Fox (1938)
 Robert Koch (1939)
 We Danced Around the World (1939)
 Wibbel the Tailor (1939)
 Passion (1940)
 Riding for Germany (1941)
 Alarm (1941)
 Rembrandt (1942)
 Melody of a Great City (1943)
 Tonelli (1943)
 When the Young Wine Blossoms (1943)
 The Bath in the Barn (1943)
 A Man With Principles? (1943)
 The Black Robe (1944)
 Love Letters (1944)
 The Court Concert (1948)

Bibliography
 Jung, Uli & Schatzberg, Walter. Beyond Caligari: The Films of Robert Wiene. Berghahn Books, 1999.

External links

1872 births
1949 deaths
German male film actors
German male silent film actors
Actors from Braunschweig
20th-century German male actors